Pandhayam may refer to:

 Pandhayam (1967 film)
 Pandhayam (2008 film)